What Did You Expect? is an album by American comedian, comedy writer and radio personality Jackie Martling.  The album was released on Martling's Off Hour Rockers label on September 12, 1979.

Track listing
Lipstick on My Dipstick
The Saran Wrap Stomp
If You Knew Suzie Like I Knew Suzie
Legs Are A Girl's Best Friend
I Laid My Peach on the Beach and Got Sand in the Fuzz
You Can Pick Your Nose and You can Pick Your Friends
I've Grown Accustomed to My Fist
The Ballad of the Dated Divorcee
She Can't Wrestle
The Enlisted Bed Wetter's Waltz

Background
In 1979, Martling issued his debut LP, What Did You Expect?  He released two more albums, 1980's Goin' Ape! and 1981's Normal People Are People You Don't Know That Well.  Martling sent all three records to fledgling New York City disk jockey Howard Stern. By 1986, he was a full-time member of Stern's show, later becoming the program's head writer. Martling maintained a steady schedule of live dates while working with Stern, recording Sgt. Pecker, F Jackie, and The Very Best of Jackie Martling's Talking Joke Book Cassettes, Vol. 1.

Notes

 

1979 albums
Jackie Martling albums
1970s comedy albums
Self-released albums